"Umpah Umpah" is a song recorded by South Korean girl group Red Velvet for their seventh (ninth overall) Korean extended play (EP) The ReVe Festival: Day 2, which serves as the second installment of the group's The ReVe Festival album trilogy. The song, alongside its vacation-themed music video, was released on August 20, 2019, as the lead single from Day 2. Written by Jeon Gan-di and composed by Christoffer Lauridsen, Andreas Öberg and Allison Kaplan, "Umpah Umpah" is described as "an uptempo dance song with disco house rhythms", with the group's "lovely and cool vocals doubling the freshness". The songwriting, which includes swimming motifs, portrays somebody falling in love with the eyes and charms of the girls, using the phrase "umpah umpah" as if their love interest was learning how to control their breathing while swimming.

Upon its release, "Umpah Umpah" received positive reviews from music critics for its bright, upbeat sound while some felt it was a "safe" return to the public-friendly sound of the group. Commercially, the song achieved moderate success in South Korea, peaking at number 18 on the Gaon Digital Chart while extending the group's consecutive top-ten string on Billboard World Digital Songs chart to 15, peaking at number nine. It also topped the Billboard K-pop Hot 100, becoming the group's second number-one single on the chart.

Background and release
Following the release of The ReVe Festival: Day 1 on June 19, 2019, several fans spotted hints for the group's next installment via clue tickets provided in the album's package, one of which mentioned the phrase "Umpah Umpah". Shortly after the group's five-year anniversary in early August 2019, it was reported that the girls would "make a speedy comeback", which was quickly confirmed by their label on the same day. On August 12, the group released an introduction video for The ReVe Festival: Day 2, which included a snippet from an then-unknown title track, which was later confirmed to be "Umpah Umpah". After a string of promotional photo teasers for each member, the music video for the song was released on August 20, 2019, at midnight KST (UTC+09:00), 18 hours ahead of the EP's digital release.

Composition 

"Umpah Umpah" was composed by Jeon Gan-di, while the production was handled by Andreas Öberg, Christoffer Lauridsen and Allison Kaplan, the former of whom produced the group's single "One of These Nights" (2016) and Japanese single "Sappy". It was composed in the key of G major with a tempo of 120 beats per minute, and is the group's seventh single under the "Red" sonic concept and their third single with a summer-inspired concept. Musically, the song was described as an "uptempo dance song with disco house rhythms", with the group's "lovely and cool" vocals "doubling the freshness". In addition to the funk influence by the electric guitar and several string instruments, the song borrows elements from doo-wop music, mostly in the pre-chorus section of the song as the girls harmonize "umpah umpah" together.

Lyrically, "Umpah Umpah" sees Red Velvet telling their love interest, who fell in love with the eyes and charms of the girls, how to "breathe normally", using the phrase "umpah umpah" as if their love interest was learning how to control their breathing while swimming. The rap section in the song's second verse references several of the group's past singles, such as "Happiness" (2014), "Ice Cream Cake" (2015), "Dumb Dumb" (2015), and "Red Flavor" (2017).

Critical reception 
"Umpah Umpah" was met with positive reviews from music critics. Kirsten Spruch of Billboard magazine viewed the track as "outlandish", and praised its "explosive chorus combined with glistening instrumentation and infectious melodies and ad libs". The Korea Times described the song as "a bright, energizing disco number laced electric sound rhythms, whose lyrics draw on summer images like deep waters and ice cream". Moreover, writer Justine Shaffer of SnackFever magazine described the song as "a sound that's a twist back to the summertime pop perfection vibes". Gallup Korea ranked the song at number eight on their list of the Best Songs of 2019, and was additionally at ranked number 47 on SBS PopAsia's list of Top 100 Asian Pop Songs of the year, describing "Umpah Umpah" as an "onomatopoeic earworm".

Accolades
"Umpah Umpah" won the Song of the Year award at the 4th Asia Artist Awards on November 26, 2019. The song also received six music program wins.

Commercial performance
Upon release, "Umpah Umpah" reached number one on four of the seven major realtime charts in Korea—Genie, Bugs, Naver, and Soribada—while reaching number three on Korea's largest music platform, Melon. The song debuted at number 18 on the Gaon Digital Chart, where it peaked for two weeks. It was later ranked at number 185 on the year-end Gaon Digital Chart for 2019. The song performed better on the Billboard K-pop Hot 100, debuting at number 19, and subsequently attained the top spot on the chart for two consecutive weeks. It became the group's second number-one single on the chart, following "Power Up" (2018), and their seventh consecutive top 10 single since the chart's re-establishment in December 2017. Additionally, the song debuted at number nine on the US World Digital Song Sales chart, thus extending their consecutive top 10 string to 15 entries on the chart.

Music video

Background 

On August 12, 2019, the first video teaser for the music video, titled "Road Trip: RVF Day 2 D-7", was uploaded to Red Velvet's official YouTube channel. A series of promotional photo teasers featuring the group members, along with a highlight video showcasing the song's pre-chorus was subsequently unveiled. A final video teaser was uploaded on August 19, and the music video for "Umpah Umpah" was released on the following day.

Synopsis and reception 
The music video is set in a cartoonish beach house, where they shelter from an incoming thunderstorm. There, they played magical board games and dance on a rainy rooftop. The song featured several references to Red Velvet's previous singles, including "Dumb Dumb", "Red Flavor", "Ice Cream Cake" and "Happiness". Following the music video's release, writer Pakkee Tan of E! described it as "a fun, frenetic, pop-electro number that evokes sunny days by the beach with a bunch of your best friends", further praising the video for being "wonderfully off-beat and delightful, as always". Puah Ziwei of NME noted its "fun-filled" nature and "the vibrant, feel-good" elements" of the music video. The group later released a dance practice video for "Umpah Umpah" on August 29, 2019.

Live performances
Following the release of the single, Red Velvet appeared and performed on several South Korean music programs, including The Show, Show! Music Core, Music Bank, and Inkigayo. On November 26, 2019, Red Velvet performed the song at the annual Asia Artist Awards at Mỹ Đình National Stadium in Hanoi, Vietnam, and marked the group's first performance of the single at an award show.

Credits and personnel 
Credits adapted from the liner notes of The ReVe Festival: Day 2.

Studio

 Recorded and engineered for mix at SM LYVIN Studio
 Recorded at SM SSAM Studio
 Mixed at SM Blue Cup Studio

Personnel

 Red Velvet (Irene, Seulgi, Wendy, Joy, Yeri)vocals, background vocals
 Jeon Gan-di – Korean songwriting
 Christoffer Lauridsencomposition, arrangement
 Andreas Öbergcomposition, arrangement, guitar
 Allison Kaplancomposition, background vocals
 ButterFlyvocal directing, Pro Tools operation, digital editing
 Seo Mi-raebackground vocals
 Hwang Seong-jebackground vocals
 Lee Ji-hongrecording, mixing engineer
 Noh Min-jirecording
 Jeong Eui-seokmixing

Charts

Weekly charts

Monthly charts

Year-end charts

Release history

See also 
 List of M Countdown Chart winners (2019)
List of Inkigayo Chart winners (2019)

References

2019 singles
2019 songs
Red Velvet (group) songs
SM Entertainment singles
Songs written by Hayley Aitken
Korean-language songs
Billboard Korea K-Pop number-one singles
Nu-disco songs
Electropop songs